Igor Yakovlevich Grichanov (born 10 September 1958) is a Russian entomologist and ecologist. As a taxonomist, he specialised on Diptera notably Dolichopodidae. He joined the staff of the All-Russian Institute of Plant Protection in 1981. From 1990 he is the Head of the Laboratory of Phytosanitary Diagnostics and Forecasts. He wrote over 470 scientific papers (1979-2016). Не has described 26 new genera and over 400 new species of flies.

Selected works
 Sigvald R., Grichanov I. Ya. (Eds.). Crop Protection Conference - Pests, Diseases and Weeds, May 28–30, 2002. Conference Report 01, Uppsala: SLU, 2003. 292 p.
 Grichanov I. Ya. Review of Afrotropical Dolichopodinae (Diptera: Dolichopodidae). St.Petersburg: VIZR, 2004. 245 p.
 Grichanov I. Ya. A checklist and keys to North European genera and species of Dolichopodidae (Diptera). St.Petersburg: VIZR, 2006. 120 p.
 Grichanov I. Ya. A checklist and keys to Dolichopodidae (Diptera) of the Caucasus and East Mediterranean. St.Petersburg: VIZR, 2007. 160 p.
 Grichanov I. Ya. An illustrated synopsis and keys to afrotropical genera of the epifamily Dolichopodoidae (Diptera: Empidoidea). Priamus Supplement, Ankara, 2011, v. 24. 98 p., 305 figs.
 Grichanov I. Ya., Negrobov O. P. (Eds.). Fauna and taxonomy of Dolichopodidae (Diptera). Collection of papers. St.Petersburg: VIZR, 2013. 96 p.
 Grichanov I. Ya., Negrobov O. P. Palaearctic species of the genus Sciapus Zeller (Diptera: Dolichopodidae). St.Petersburg, VIZR, 2014. 84 p..
 Grichanov I. Ya. Alphabetic list of generic and specific names of predatory flies of the epifamily Dolichopodoidae (Diptera). St.Petersburg, VIZR, 2014. 544 p..

References

 Foreword. In: Grichanov I. Ya. Russian-English and English-Russian vocabulary for entomologists. Saint-Petersburg: VIZR, 2004, 116 p. [Russian]
 To the jubilee of Grichanov I. Ya. Plant Protection News, 2008, No 3, p. 78 . [Russian]

External links
 Profile, Voronezh State University [Russian]
 Profile, All-Russian Institute of Plant Protection [Russian]
 Profile, Google Scholar
 EOL New taxa described by Grichanov

Living people
Russian entomologists
1958 births
21st-century Russian zoologists
Soviet entomologists
Voronezh State University alumni
20th-century Russian zoologists
People from Voronezh